Pert was a sidewheel steamboat that operated in British Columbia on the Columbia River from 1887 to 1905, often transporting large loads of timber. Pert was also known as Alert and City of Windermere at times.

Design and construction
Pert was built at Golden, British Columbia, by Fred Wells, who named the vessel Alert. The vessel seems to have been originally built as a bateau, that is, an unpowered river vessel propelled by oars or by poling along the river. An engine and sidewheels were installed in 1890.

Operations

In 1891, Capt. Frank P. Armstrong started operating Pert as part of his steamboat line, the Upper Columbia Navigation & Tramway Co. (UCN&T) to operate on the headwaters of the Columbia River above Golden, an area which is known as the Columbia Valley. From 1892 to 1898, Armstrong ran Pert on Columbia Lake.

Use on Columbia Lake
The river flowing out of Columbia Lake was often too shallow for a steamboat, and so UCN&T built a mule or horse-drawn tramway extending to the northern end of Columbia Lake. Cargoes bound south to the valley of the upper Kootenay River would be loaded on the tramway, and pulled to the wharf on the lake, then loaded on Pert. The steamboat would then paddle south across the lake to the portage at Canal Flats. The cargo would then be unloaded and portaged over to the Kootenay River. When Pert was running on the river, a canal and lock connected Columbia Lake with the Kootenay River. The canal was not much used; only three steamboat transits were ever made.

Sale
In 1898 Armstrong sold Pert to Capt. Alex Blakely, who rebuilt the vessel into a propeller-driven towboat with a new name, City of Windermere. In 1903, Blakely sold it to Capt. E.N. Russell, who changed the vessel's name back to Pert and ran her on Windermere Lake and the upper Columbia River from 1903 to 1905.

Abandonment
Pert was abandoned in 1905 on Windermere Lake.

Notes

Further reading

 Faber, Jim, Steamer's Wake—Voyaging down the old marine highways of Puget Sound, British Columbia, and the Columbia River, Enetai Press, Seattle, WA 1985 
 Timmen, Fritz, Blow for the Landing, Caxton Printers, Caldwell, ID 1972 

Paddle steamers of British Columbia
Steamboats of the Columbia River
Columbia Valley